Yusup Rashidovich Abdusalamov (born November 8, 1977; Dagestan) is a USSR-born Russian and Tajik wrestler, who won a silver medal at the 2008 Summer Olympics.

Career
Having won the freestyle wrestling title in his weight category at the 2003 Asian championship, Abdusalomov made his Olympic debut at the 2004 Summer Olympics in Athens where he finished 9th place overall in the men's freestyle 74kg category. He followed this the following year with a relatively disappointing 13th place in the 2005 FILA Wrestling World Championships in Budapest. Abdusalamov was to improve on this at the 2007 World Championships in Baku where he claimed second place, having moved up to the 84 kg weight category. At the next Olympics in 2008 Beijing, he repeated his good form from the world championships to claim the silver medal in the 84kg category. In the 2012 Summer Olympics, however, he was unable to achieve a medal after having lost to Gadzhimurad Nurmagomedov of Armenia.

References
 Yusup Abdusalomov's profile at ESPN Sports

External links

 

1977 births
Living people
Sportspeople from Makhachkala
Tajikistani male sport wrestlers
Olympic wrestlers of Tajikistan
Olympic silver medalists for Tajikistan
Olympic medalists in wrestling
Wrestlers at the 2004 Summer Olympics
Wrestlers at the 2008 Summer Olympics
Wrestlers at the 2012 Summer Olympics
Medalists at the 2008 Summer Olympics
Asian Games silver medalists for Tajikistan
Asian Games medalists in wrestling
Wrestlers at the 2002 Asian Games
Medalists at the 2002 Asian Games
World Wrestling Championships medalists